Eupithecia anasticta is a moth in the family Geometridae. It is found in northern Myanmar, India (Sikkim) and Laos.

The forewings are uniform dark brown. The hindwings are slightly paler.

References

Moths described in 1926
anasticta
Moths of Asia